Designer clothing is expensive luxury clothing considered to be high quality and haute couture for the general public, made by, or carrying the label of, a well-known fashion designer.

Brands 

Designer clothing is not always created by the founder of the company. For example, the actual designer of Chanel is not its original founder and designer, Gabrielle Chanel, but French designer Virginie Viard. The quality of the clothing and degree of its resemblance, if any, to the designer's work vary considerably depending on the licensee and the terms of the agreement the designer has struck. Some terms may limit the number of garment styles that may be produced, allowing the designer to veto any designs he or she finds unappealing. Examples include:

 Armani
Alexander Wang
 Balenciaga
 Balmain
 Berluti
 Bottega Veneta
 Burberry
 Calvin Klein
 Chanel
 Céline
 Christian Louboutin
 DSquared2
 Diesel
 Dior
 Dolce & Gabbana
 Escada
 Fendi
 Givenchy
 Gucci
 Hermès
 Jean Paul Gaultier
 Jil Sander
 Karl Lagerfeld
 Kenzo
 Karl Lagerfeld
 Loewe
 Longchamp
 Louis Vuitton
 Marc Jacobs
 Max Mara
 Michael Kors
MISBHV
 Oscar de la Renta
 Ralph Lauren
 Philipp Plein
 Prada
 Saint Laurent Paris
 Salvatore Ferragamo
 Tod's
 Tommy Hilfiger
 Valentino
 Versace

This licensing of designer names was pioneered by designers like Pierre Cardin in the 1960s and has been a common practice within the fashion industry from about the 1970s.

Designer jeans 
   
   
   
      
 
Designer jeans are available at many different price points usually at several hundreds of dollars, with some even approaching US$1,000. Before the "Great Recession", premium denim was one of the fastest growing categories of the apparel business, and there seemed to be no limit to what customers would pay for the latest label, fit, finish, or wash.   
 
Americans bought US$13.8 billion of men's and women's jeans in the year ended April 30, 2011, according to market-research firm NPD Group. But only about 1% of jeans sold in the U.S. over that year cost more than $50. Since the "Great Recession," the landscape for premium jeans has changed: "Charging $600 for jeans for no reason at all — those days are over," said You Nguyen, the senior vice president of women's merchandising and design for Levi Strauss & Company.

The difference between the $300 jeans and the $30 jeans often has to do with the fabric quality, hardware, washes, design details, abrasions, and where they are manufactured. A "fancy" pair of jeans that has been treated with abrasions, extra washes, etc., to break the denim down to achieve a texture has undergone a certain amount of damage to get the 'worn in' feel. In this sense, the expensive jeans may be more delicate than the cheap ones. Jeans brands also try to stand out from season to season by using patented materials, such as rivets and stitching, and by using special washes and distressing methods. These might involve dying, pressing, and even using sandpaper and drills on the raw jeans. These methods can be particularly expensive when done in the U.S., where factories must meet more stringent environmental and labor standards than in many low-cost nations.

To be produced domestically (in the United States), jeans have to be priced at "$200-plus," says Shelda Hartwell-Hale, a vice president at Directives West, an L.A.-based division of fashion consulting firm Doneger Group. The profit margins on premium jeans can be substantial. One retail executive says his gross profit margins for private-label jeans, which he makes for Wal-Mart Stores Inc., Sears Holdings Corp., and other retailers, are less than 20%, whereas the margins for his own premium lines are 40%-to-50%.

See also 
History of Western fashion
Digital fashion
Red carpet fashion

References

Further reading 
 Agins, Terry, The End of Fashion: How Marketing Changed the Clothing Business Forever, Harper Paperbacks: 2000.

Fashion
1970s fashion
1980s fashion
1990s fashion
2000s fashion